The 2019 Asia Rugby Sevens Olympic Qualifying Tournament is a rugby sevens tournament scheduled to be held in Incheon on the 23-24 November 2019. This tournament serves as the 2020 Olympic Rugby Sevens regional qualifier, the winner of the tournament will collect direct qualification to the 2020 Summer Olympics, whilst the runner-up and third place finisher will advance to the Olympic repechage tournament.

Main tournament
All match times in Korean Standard Time (UTC+9)

Teams
The teams rankings is based on where they finished in the 2019 Asia Rugby Sevens Series

Pool stages
Teams were placed into each pool following their seeding in the 2019 Asia Rugby Sevens Series.

Pool A

Pool B

Pool C

Knockout stage

Play-Off Final

Olympic Qualification (Cup)

Plate

Standings

References

Asia
Asia
Asia Rugby Sevens
Asia Rugby